Marc Streitenfeld (born 1974) is a German composer of film scores. He has frequently collaborated with director Ridley Scott. Streitenfeld has composed the music for many high-profile Hollywood features as well as critically acclaimed independent films, including American Gangster, Body of Lies, The Grey, Prometheus, Poltergeist and All I See Is You.

Life and career
Born in Munich, Germany, Streitenfeld relocated to Los Angeles at age 19 and initially assisted film composer Hans Zimmer.  Director Ridley Scott offered Streitenfeld his first composing job when he asked him to write the score for A Good Year (2006). Streitenfeld has written five film scores for Scott, including the BAFTA nominated score for American Gangster (2007), for which he won the "Discovery of the Year" Award at the World Soundtrack Awards, the sci-fi adventure Prometheus (2012) and the action adventure Robin Hood (2010). He has also been recognized for his work with three ASCAP Film and Television Music Awards and two International Film Music Critics Association award nominations. Streitenfeld has also worked with Marc Forster on All I See Is You (2017), Joe Carnahan on the action drama The Grey (2011), and Andrew Dominik the neo-noir crime film Killing Them Softly (2012).

Streitenfeld has recorded many of his scores at Abbey Road Studios, in London.

From 2007 to 2012, Streitenfeld was in a relationship with French-American actress Julie Delpy. In January 2009, the couple had a son, Leo.

Filmography

Films

Television

References

External links
 
 

German emigrants to the United States
German film score composers
Male film score composers
German male composers
Living people
Musicians from Munich
1974 births